Paul Haslwanter (born 17 January 1915, date of death unknown) was an Austrian cross-country skier. He competed in the men's 18 kilometre event at the 1948 Winter Olympics.

References

1915 births
Year of death missing
Austrian male cross-country skiers
Austrian male Nordic combined skiers
Olympic cross-country skiers of Austria
Olympic Nordic combined skiers of Austria
Cross-country skiers at the 1948 Winter Olympics
Nordic combined skiers at the 1948 Winter Olympics
Sportspeople from Tyrol (state)
20th-century Austrian people